Show You Colour is the Chinese rock artist Cui Jian's fifth album, released on 23 March 2005. In contrast to his previous work, 'Show You Colour' combines elements of rock, popular music, hip-hop and electronic music to produce its distinctive sound.

Themes
Show You Colour is divided into three themes; red representing the internal spirit, yellow representing love and blue representing wisdom or knowledge.

"Blue Bone"
The second track is the most popular track with netizens, downloads and streams of the song far exceeding others on the album. The song ·蓝色骨头· (lanse gutou), which translates as "Blue Bone" (or alternatively "Blue Man of Character") seems to be the album's main song, as Chinese music site, Douban, stated that the colour blue comes across as the most important of the colour themes. Although it concerns itself with "literate people" the song is Cui Jian's personal portrait of society and life. Douban suggests that only listeners who understand "Blue Bones" can grasp Cui Jian's current own situation and knowledge of life.

Critical reception
The album received majority positive reviews, with users on music site 360buy giving it 4 out of 5 stars.

Track listing
 城市船夫 (chengshi chuanfu/"City Boatman")
 蓝色骨头 (lanse gutou/"Blue Bone") *possibly "Blue Man of Character"
 迷失的季节 (mishi de jijie/"The Lost Season")
 小城故事v21(上) (xiaocheng gushi v21 (shang)/"Small Town Story v21 (part 1)")
 红先生 (hong xiansheng/"Mr Red")
 网络处男 (wangluo chunan/"Network Virgin")
 小城故事v21(中) (xiaocheng gushi v21 (zhong)/"Small Town Story v21 (part 2)")
 农村包围城市 (nongcun baowei chengshi/"Country Surrounding the City")
 小城故事v21(下) (xiaocheng gushi v21 (xia)/"Small Town Story v21 (part 3)")
 舞过38线　(wu guo 38 xian/"Dancing across the 38th Parallel")
 超越那一天 (chaoyue na yi tian/"Exceed That Day")

References

External links 
 Official Website Album List

2005 albums
Cui Jian albums
Mandarin-language albums